"Pour Me Another Tequila" is a song co-written and recorded by American country music artist Eddie Rabbitt. It was released in October 1979 as the second single from the album Loveline.  The song reached number 5 on the Billboard Hot Country Singles & Tracks chart.  It was written by Rabbitt, Even Stevens and David Malloy.

Chart performance

References

1979 songs
1979 singles
Eddie Rabbitt songs
Songs written by Eddie Rabbitt
Songs written by David Malloy
Song recordings produced by David Malloy
Elektra Records singles
Songs written by Even Stevens (songwriter)